Pedro de Lafuente (died 13 August 1587) was a Roman Catholic prelate who served as Bishop of Pamplona (1578–1587).

Biography
On 28 February 1575, Pedro de Lafuente was appointed during the papacy of Pope Gregory XIII as Bishop of Pamplona. In December 1578, he was consecrated bishop by Francisco Pacheco de Villena, Archbishop of Burgos. He served as Bishop of Pamplona until his death on 13 August 1587.

References 

16th-century Roman Catholic bishops in Spain
Bishops appointed by Pope Gregory XIII
1587 deaths